Castlethorpe Castle stood in the village of Castlethorpe, to the north of Milton Keynes, Buckinghamshire.

This was originally a motte and bailey castle with a timber structure built by Winemar, the Flemish Lord of Hanslope in the 11th or 12th Century.  It was at that time known as Hanslope Castle.  The castle was destroyed in 1215 by Faulkes de Breauté during the First Barons' War and was never rebuilt.

Today only the earthworks remain.

Location 
Castlethorpe Castle stood in the village of Castlethorpe, which was part of the manor of Hanslope in mediaeval times.  It is situated to the north of Milton Keynes, Buckinghamshire.

History 
Castlethorpe Castle belonged to lord of Hanslope and was constructed in the 12th century, or possibly slightly earlier. In 1066 William I granted the manor of Hanslope to Winemar the Fleming, who built the fortifications. In 1086 it was in the hundred of Bunsty and ownership was the same. During the reign of Henry I it was the baronial castle of Winemar's descendant William Mauduit, chamberlain to the king. During period known as The Anarchy (1138–1153) the Mauduit family, who owned the castle at that time, supported Empress Matilda against King Stephen.

In disputes between King John and the barons, Robert Mauduit sided with the barons against the king. In the autumn of 1215 Faulkes de Breauté, general of King John, attacked the castle and destroyed it, taking the manor of Hanslope. Although Robert Mauduit eventually regained the manor the castle was never rebuilt.

The Anglo Saxon name Castlethorpe means “farm or secondary settlement of the castle”.

The site is now a scheduled ancient monument, although only earthworks remain, with no traces of masonry.

Layout 
The family probably lived in hall within the inner bailey, which has entrances on the west and northwest, and there are signs that there were extensive buildings on the site

See also 
Castles in Great Britain and Ireland
List of castles in England

References 

Fry, Plantagenet Somerset, The David & Charles Book of Castles, David & Charles, 1980. 

Castles in Buckinghamshire